Roger Robb (July 7, 1907 – December 19, 1985) was a United States circuit judge of the United States Court of Appeals for the District of Columbia Circuit and trial attorney, best known for his key role as special counsel to an Atomic Energy Commission hearing that led to revocation of J. Robert Oppenheimer's security clearance in 1954.

Education and career

Robb was born in Bellows Falls, Vermont, the son of Court of Appeals Judge Charles Henry Robb. He received an Artium Baccalaureus degree from Yale University in 1928. He received a Bachelor of Laws from Yale Law School in 1931. He was an Assistant United States Attorney for the District of Columbia from 1931 to 1938. Robb was in private practice in Washington, D.C. from 1938 to 1969.

Notable cases

Robb was the court-appointed attorney for Earl Browder, a leader of the Communist Party, in a Contempt of Congress case in 1950, earning praise from Browder despite their political differences. He also successfully defended Otto Otepka, a former State Department official accused of giving unauthorized material to a Senate committee.

Robb was probably best known as special counsel to the Atomic Energy Commission at an AEC hearing on the loyalty of J. Robert Oppenheimer, the father of the atomic bomb. Over the course of four weeks, Robb and the AEC panel interrogated Oppenheimer and other witnesses on his past affiliations with Communists, with Robb using harsh prosecutorial tactics. The board voted 2–1 to strip Oppenheimer of his security clearance.

In 1968, Robb represented Barry Goldwater in his libel suit against Ralph Ginzburg and Fact Magazine, which had claimed that Goldwater was mentally unstable. The jury awarded Goldwater $1 in compensatory damages and $75,000 in punitive damages, which was upheld on appeal.

Federal judicial service

Robb was nominated by President Richard Nixon on April 23, 1969, to a seat on the United States Court of Appeals for the District of Columbia Circuit vacated by Judge John A. Danaher. He was confirmed by the United States Senate on May 5, 1969, and received his commission on May 6, 1969. He assumed senior status on May 31, 1982, and was succeeded by Judge Antonin Scalia. His service was terminated on December 19, 1985, due to his death.

Family

Robb was married three times. His first two wives, Mary Ernst Cooper and Lillian Nordstrom predeceased him. His third wife Irene Rice, survived him. He had a son.

Film portrayals

Robb was portrayed by Philip O'Brien in the 1980 BBC miniseries Oppenheimer, and by Michael Cumpsty in The Trials of J. Robert Oppenheimer, a 2009 episode of the PBS series The American Experience.

References

Sources
 
 .
 

1907 births
1985 deaths
Yale Law School alumni
Lawyers from Washington, D.C.
Judges of the United States Court of Appeals for the D.C. Circuit
United States court of appeals judges appointed by Richard Nixon
20th-century American judges
People from Bellows Falls, Vermont
People from Washington, D.C.
Assistant United States Attorneys